Małgorzata Mesjasz (born 12 June 1997) is a Polish professional footballer who plays as a defender for Italian Serie A club AC Milan and the Poland women's national team.

Career
Mesjasz has been capped for the Poland national team, appearing for the team during the 2019 FIFA Women's World Cup qualifying cycle.

International goals

References

External links
 
 
 

1998 births
Living people
Polish women's footballers
Poland women's international footballers
Women's association football midfielders
1. FFC Turbine Potsdam players
Frauen-Bundesliga players